The 1984 Carlsberg Challenge was a non-ranking snooker tournament, which took place between 14 and 16 September 1984. The tournament featured four professional players and was filmed in RTÉ Studios, Dublin, for broadcast on RTÉ.

Jimmy White won the tournament defeating Tony Knowles 9–7.


Main draw
Results are shown below:

References

Fosters Professional
Carlsberg Challenge
Carlsberg Challenge
Carlsberg Challenge